Syston Rugby Football Club is an English rugby union team based in Queniborough, Leicestershire. The club runs four Senior sides, a Vets, Colts and all age groups from U7 to U19. The first XV currently plays in Midlands Premier, at the fifth tier of the English rugby union system, following their promotion from Midlands 1 East at the end of the 2019–20 season.

History
Syston RFC was formed in 1887 when a number of players who lived locally or who attended nearby Barrow Grammar School came together to form the club.
 The club had various homes over the years in Syston and their first real home was on the Fosse Way in Syston where the foundations for the current Club were firmly laid. With a permanent home at Fosse Way the club's fortunes began to improve, and by the late 1960s the club was beginning to flourish as the local schools took to playing rugby and a steady stream of players was assured.

The club regained its level 5 status in 2011 after the 1st XV gained promotion as champions from Midlands 1 East into National League 3 (Midlands). The club had not played at that level for a decade.

Honours
Leicestershire County Cup winners (9): 1912, 1986, 1990, 1993, 1995, 1997, 2010, 2018, 2019
Midlands 1 East champions (4): 1990–91, 2010–11, 2014–15, 2019–20
Midlands 3 East (North) champions: 2006–07
Midlands 1 (east v west) promotion play-off winner: 2017–18

Notable players
Syston RFC has a history of developing young players with the Club providing players for the County representative sides at all age groups for many years. A number of these players have gone on to play for Leicester Tigers in the top flight of English club rugby with some going on to represent England at full international level and one, Paul Dodge, also becoming England Captain and a member of the 1980 British Lions squad who toured in South Africa.

 Matt Cornwell
 Louis Deacon
 Brett Deacon
 Paul Dodge
 Matt Hampson

Notes

References

External links
Official club website

English rugby union teams
Rugby clubs established in 1887
Rugby union clubs in Leicestershire